
Proszowice County is a unit of territorial administration and local government (powiat) in Lesser Poland Voivodeship, southern Poland. It came into being on January 1, 1999, as a result of the Polish local government reforms passed in 1998. Its only other town is Nowe Brzesko (since 2011).

As of 2006 its total population is 43,441, out of which the population of Proszowice was 6,205 and the rural population was 37,236.

Neighbouring counties
Proszowice County is bordered by Kazimierza County and Tarnów County to the east, Brzesko County to the south-east, Bochnia County to the south, Kraków County to the south and west, and Miechów County to the north-west.

Administrative division
The county is subdivided into six gminas (two urban-rural and four rural). These are listed in the following table, in descending order of population.

Proszowice County in the past  
The history of Proszowice County dates back to the early 16th century, when it was created. Until the Partitions of Poland, the county was part of Kraków Voivodeship. It had the area of 2880 sq. kilometers, with 15 towns, including Kraków, Będzin, Chrzanów, Olkusz, Sławków, Działoszyce, Słomniki and Nowe Brzesko.

Proszowice County was disbanded by Austrian authorities in 1794, and most of its territory was merged into District of Miechów. From 1815 until 1916, most of former county belonged to Russian-controlled Congress Poland. Separated by Austro-Russian border from the city of Kraków, the region stagnated, with Proszowice losing its town charter in 1864.

In the Second Polish Republic, Proszowice regained town rights in 1923, but was not named seat of a county. After World War II, Proszowice belonged to Miechów County until 1954, when Proszowice County was recreated. It existed until 1975 when all counties were disbanded (see Administrative division of the Polish People's Republic).

References
Polish official population figures 2006

 
Proszowice